Kyle Kothari (born 26 January 1998) is an English diver representing Great Britain and England in competition. At the 2022 Commonwealth Games, he won a silver medal in the 10 metre mixed synchronised platform, and placed fourth in the 10 metre synchronised platform. He is a 2022 European champion in the 10 metre mixed synchronised platform and the 10 metre synchronised platform.

Career
At the 2018 British National Diving Championships, held in January in Plymouth, Kothari and his partner Matty Lee won the national title and gold medal in the 10 metre synchronised platform with a score of 406.17 points.

2022
Leading up to the 2022 Commonwealth Games, as part of the 2022 FINA Diving Grand Prix held in June in Calgary, Canada, Kothari won the silver medal in the 10 metre synchronised platform with partner Ben Cutmore, achieving a final mark of 374.58 points.

2022 Commonwealth Games
In early August, at the 2022 Commonwealth Games held in Birmingham, Kothari and his partner Ben Cutmore placed fourth in the 10 metre synchronised platform on day two of diving competition with a score of 391.35 points, finishing 21.21 points behind the bronze medalists Cassiel Rousseau and Domonic Bedggood of Australia. Three days later, he won a silver medal in the 10 metre mixed synchronised platform, scoring a total of 318.54 points with his partner Lois Toulson to finish behind the gold medal duo, also of England. Their silver medal contributed to a record number of 15 total medals won by divers representing England at a single Commonwealth Games.

2022 European Aquatics Championships
Kothari entered to compete in two events at the 2022 European Aquatics Championships, held in mid-August in Rome, Italy, the team event and the 10 metre mixed synchronised platform. On the first day of diving, both he and Lois Toulson were substituted out and two other divers representing Great Britain were substituted in for the team event. In the 10 metre mixed synchronised platform, he and Louis Toulson won the gold medal with a score of 300.78 points, finishing over two points ahead of the team that won the silver medal from Ukraine. Three days later, in the 10 metre synchronised platform, he achieved another narrow gold medal-victory, this time scoring 2.46 points ahead of the silver medalists from Ukraine with a final score of 390.48 points achieved with partner Ben Cutmore.

International championships

References

External links
 

1998 births
Living people
British male divers
English male divers
Commonwealth Games medallists in diving
Commonwealth Games silver medallists for England
Divers at the 2022 Commonwealth Games
Medallists at the 2022 Commonwealth Games